Batman: The Audio Adventures is a comedic radio drama podcast series featuring the DC Comics character Batman. The 2021 show, DC's first scripted podcast, is produced by DC Entertainment, Blue Ribbon Content and HBO Max. The series is meant to be an homage to the original 1966 Batman TV series as well as the 1992 Batman: The Animated Series. It is directed and written by Dennis McNicholas, a writer for Saturday Night Live. Production companies involved with the series are Insurrection Media and WarnerMedia. The series is executive produced by Kiliaen Van Rensselaer, Deborah Henderson, and Jon Berg.

Season 2 was released on October 7, 2022, and consists of 10 episodes.

Premise
For the first time, Batman is being deputized as an official member of the Gotham City Police Department. Meanwhile, Two-Face begins losing control over which of his split personalities is the dominant one. The Joker begins to set a diabolical plan into motion while The Riddler escapes from Arkham Asylum.

Voice cast
 Jeffrey Wright as Bruce Wayne/Batman
 Chris Parnell as Narrator
 Ike Barinholtz as Two-Face/Harvey Dent
 Rosario Dawson as Catwoman
 Brent Spiner as The Joker
 Jason Sudeikis as Hamilton Hill
 Brooke Shields as Vicki Vale
 Gillian Jacobs as Harley Quinn
 John Leguizamo as The Riddler/Edward Nigma
 Kenan Thompson as Commissioner Gordon
 Bradley Whitford as Dr. Jonathan Crane/Scarecrow
 Bobby Moynihan as The Penguin/Oswald Cobblepot and Bat-Mite
 Seth Meyers as Jack Ryder
 Alan Tudyk as Alfred Pennyworth
 Melissa Villaseñor as Robin
 Tim Meadows as Jeremiah Arkham
 Fred Armisen as King Scimitar
 Heidi Gardner as Miss Tuesday
 Ray Wise as Announcer
 Paul Scheer as Mr. Charleyhorse

Additional voices include Ben Rodgers, Aristotle Athari, Toby Huss, Steve Higgins, Paula Pell, and Ellis Hall.

Tie-in comics
Batman: The Audio Adventures Special: It is a prequel comic, released by DC Comics on October 12, 2021. Among its writers are Dennis McNicholas, Bobby Moynihan, Heidi Gardner, Paul Scheer with art by Leonardo Romero, Juni Ba, Anthony Marques, J. Bone, German Peralta, Emma Kubert, Jon Mikel, Derec Donovan, Jacob Edgar, Jesus Hervas and Rich Ellis.
Batman: The Audio Adventures: A seven-issue monthly sequel miniseries released by DC Comics, authored by McNicholas, with art by Anthony Marques. The first issue was released on September 27, 2022 in the US. Set just after the events of the podcast, Batman must now deal with the machinations of Ra's al Ghul and his League of Assassins as well as a Killer Croc who has been adversely affected by the Joker's "dark purple dawn", among other problems in the infamous underbelly of Gotham City.

References

External links

DC page: BTAAS2021, BTAA2022

2021 podcast debuts
2021 podcast endings
American podcasts
American radio dramas
Audio podcasts
Batman in other media
Comic book podcasts
Crime podcasts
HBO Max original programming
Works based on DC Comics
Batman radio series